is a Japanese 4-panel comedy manga series by Rikō Anzai, was serialized in Takeshobo's seinen manga magazine Manga Life as well as sister magazine Manga Life Momo from July 2011 to June 2020. It has been collected in 15 tankōbon volumes. A 12-episode anime television series adaptation by C2C aired between January 8, 2014 and March 26, 2014, and was simulcast by Crunchyroll. A thirteenth OVA episode was included in the first Blu-ray volume released on March 22, 2014.

Premise

14-year-old Tomoya Mizuhara becomes the stepbrother of 17-year-old Ichika when their parents got remarried. Hilarity ensues as Ichika tries to gain Tomoya's affection.

Characters

Tomoya Mizuhara is a fourteen-year-old boy and the story's main protagonist. Although reserved and well-mannered, he is annoyed at Ichika's regular attempt to enter his room and act affectionately towards him. He likes Ichika's friends and has a crush on Mina Fujisaki but he is oblivious to the latter's disparaging nature.

Ichika Mizuhara is the seventeen-year-old titular stepsister in the series. Outspoken and passionate, she immediately falls in love with Tomoya and is overly protective of him. She sometimes acts like a stalker and is jealous of any girls that showed affection to Tomoya.

Mina Fujisaki is Tomoya's classmate. She acts cute and sweet on the outside but she is secretly a narcissist with a mean streak. She considers Ichika to be a rival when the latter drawn all the guys' attentions away from her. Tomoya treats her kindly even if she yells at him and she nearly confesses to Kōki when she received a White Day gift from him in one of the episodes.

Nicknamed "Ruri-Ruri", Ruri Hayasaka is Ichika's friend who shared her opinion about Tomoya's adorability but she does not treat her brother nicely.

Nicknamed "Marinacchi-san", Marina Mochizuki is Ichika's well-endowed friend with blonde hair. She often plays the straight man role in the series. Many of the boys are attracted to her bust.

Mitsuru Hanazono is Tomoya's classmate with a mind always in the gutter. Even though he is envious of Tomoya for being surrounded by pretty ladies, Mitsuru still defends Tomoya fiercely when Kōki harassed him. He prefers Ichika and her girlfriends as opposed to those in his class.

Kōki Hayasaka is Tomoya's uptight classmate who often got admired for his academic ability. He is later revealed to be Ruri's little brother and has a secret crush on her despite her harsh treatment towards him.

Sōichirō Fuji is Marina's half-brother and is quoted as "what you call just a pretty face". He is half-Russian with blonde hair but he can speak English and Japanese. He is revealed to be an otaku when he found Ichika resembling an idol character he liked.

Yūko Mizuhara is Tomoya's stepmother.

Masaya Mizuhara is Tomoya's father who became the husband of Ichika's mother.

Media

Manga

Anime

The official website of Manga Life announced on December 10, 2013 the anime adaptation of Oneechan ga Kita. Produced by C2C, the three-minute-long anime series is directed by Yoshihide Yuuzumi and the characters are designed by Takeshi Oda. The first promotional video was released on December 16, 2013, which revealed the main cast and staff. Crunchyroll began to simulcast the series when it premiered in Japan on January 8, 2014. The thirteenth episode was bundled with the Blu-ray release on March 22, 2014.

The ending theme song titled "Piece" is composed by Fūga Hatori and performed by Misuzu Togashi.

Notes

References

External links
 

Anime series based on manga
C2C (studio)
Comedy anime and manga
Seinen manga
Takeshobo manga
Tokyo MX original programming
Yonkoma